Johanna Cornelia van der Merwe (7 March 1825 – 15 January 1888) was a Voortrekker heroine who survived the Weenen massacre, an impi attack on her trekking party on 17 February 1838, despite suffering more than twenty assegai wounds.

She later married Hendrik Fredercik Delport with whom she had seven sons (despite being permanently crippled by the attack).  She died aged 62 and was buried in Rouxville.

An ox-wagon in the historic 1938 Great Trek Centenary commemoration trek as well as a South African Navy submarine were named in her honour.

References

Afrikaner people
South African people of Dutch descent
1825 births
1888 deaths